"Chūsotsu": Ebichū no Ike Ike Best and "Chūkara": Ebichū no Waku Waku Best are two best-of albums by the Japanese girl idol group Shiritsu Ebisu Chugaku. They were released in Japan simultaneously on November 16, 2016. This marks the final release featuring Rina Matsuno, who died on February 8, 2017.

"Chūsotsu": Ebichū no Ike Ike Best 

 contains all the band's major-label hits to date (all the A-sides of the first ten major-label singles), one B-side and one album track. Some songs were re-recorded with the current line-up.

The album contains songs of different genres, such as heavy metal, melocore and electro. The Japan-based music website CDJournal in its review of the album states that the album does well in both showing the band's individually and reflecting its musical career. The site also notes the musicality of the songs and how the lyrics make use of each member's individuality.

Track listing

"Chūkara": Ebichū no Waku Waku Best 

 contains selected major-label B-sides and album tracks. Some songs were re-recorded with the current line-up. There is also one new song, titled "Sudden Death".

Track listing

"Chūsotsu" "Chūkara": Ebichū no Complete Best 
 is a limited-edition box set. It includes both albums plus a third CD with a special DJ mix.

Contents 
 CD1："Chūsotsu": Ebichū no Ike Ike Best
 CD2："Chūkara": Ebichū no Waku Waku Best
 CD3：Ebichu's Championship Tera-Mix (Mixed by CMJK)  (• mix of 81 songs, lasting 58:44)

Charts

"Chūsotsu": Ebichū no Ike Ike Best

"Chūkara": Ebichū no Waku Waku Best

References

External links 
 "Chūsotsu" "Chūkara" special website by Sony Music Japan

Shiritsu Ebisu Chugaku albums
2016 greatest hits albums
SME Records albums